Twitter may suspend accounts, temporarily or permanently, from their social networking service. Suspensions of high-profile individuals often attract media attention when they occur. There have been concerted campaigns by Twitter to shut down terrorist organizations and accounts that promote terrorist action, such as those promoting the Islamic State of Iraq and the Levant (ISIL), particularly in the mid-2010s, and to shut down QAnon conspiracy theorists since 2020. Twitter's use of suspensions has been controversial.

Policy
Users who are suspended from Twitter, based on alleged violations of Twitter's terms of service, are usually not informed which of their tweets were the cause. They are told only that their accounts will not be restored, and they are told which of Twitter's rules the company claims were violated. In addition to community guideline policy decisions, the Twitter DMCA-detection system and spam-detection system are sometimes manipulated or abused by groups of users attempting to force a user's suspension.

In January 2019, Twitter formally provided information on instances where governments have attempted to utilize Twitter for "foreign information operations".

Some commentators, such as technology entrepreneur Declan McCullagh and law professor Glenn Reynolds, have criticized Twitter's suspension and ban policies as overreaches of power.

Twitter frequently responds to media enquiries about suspended accounts with "We do not comment on individual accounts, for privacy and security reasons".

History
Between 2014 and 2016, Twitter suspensions were frequently linked to ISIL-related accounts. A "Twitter suspension campaign" began in earnest in 2015, and on one day, 4 April 2015, some 10,000 accounts were suspended. Twitter repeatedly shut down accounts that spread ISIL material, but new ones popped up quickly and were advertised with their old Twitter handle; Twitter in return blocked those in what was called an ongoing game of Whac-A-Mole. By August 2014, Twitter had suspended a dozen official ISIL accounts, and between September and December 2014 it suspended at least 1000 accounts promoting ISIL. Twitter said that between mid-2015 and February 2016 it had suspended 125,000 accounts associated with ISIL and related organizations, and by August 2016 had suspended some 360,000 accounts for being associated with terrorism (not all these were ISIL-related).

In January 2016, Twitter was sued by the widow of an American man killed in the 2015 Amman shooting attack, claiming that allowing ISIL to continually use the platform, including direct messages in particular, constituted the provision of material support to a terrorist organization. Twitter disputed the claim. The lawsuit was dismissed by the United States District Court for the Northern District of California, upholding the Section 230 safe harbor, which dictates that the operators of an interactive computer service are not liable for the content published by its users. The lawsuit was revised in August 2016, providing comparisons to other telecommunications devices.

Twitter suspended multiple parody accounts that satirized Russian politics in May 2016, sparking protests and raising questions about where the company stands on freedom of speech. Following public outcry, Twitter restored the accounts the next day without explaining why the accounts had been suspended. The same day, Twitter, along with Facebook, Google, and Microsoft, jointly agreed to a European Union code of conduct obligating them to review "[the] majority of valid notifications for removal of illegal hate speech" posted on their services within 24 hours. In August 2016, Twitter stated that it had banned 235,000 accounts over the past six months, bringing the overall number of suspended accounts to 360,000 accounts in the past year, for violating policies banning use of the platform to promote extremism.

On 10 May 2019, Twitter announced that they suspended 166,513 accounts for promoting terrorism in the July–December 2018 period, stating there was a steady decrease in terrorist groups trying to use the platform owing to its "zero-tolerance policy enforcement". According to Vijaya Gadde, Legal, Policy and Trust and Safety Lead at Twitter, there was a reduction of 19% terror-related tweets from the previous reporting period (January–June 2018).

In September 2017, Twitter responded to calls to suspend U.S. President Donald Trump's account, clarifying that they will not do so as they consider his tweets to be "newsworthy".

In October 2017, Twitter posted a calendar of upcoming changes related to enforcement. Among other things, Twitter promised to provide "a better experience for suspension appeals", including a detailed description to the user of how a suspended account violated the rules.

In November 2017, Twitter gave a deadline of 18 December to comply with their new policy, adding: "You also may not affiliate with organizations that—whether by their own statements or activity both on and off the platform—use or promote violence against civilians to further their causes". On 18 December, the accounts of several high-profile organizations were suspended.

Following Elon Musk's acquisition of Twitter in October 2022, it was reported that the platform was planning to end the use of permanent suspensions. In November 2022, Musk stated that accounts that engage in impersonation without a "clear" parody label would be permanently suspended without warning.

Many anti-fascist activists were purged from Twitter in November 2022 after Musk outsourced content moderation decisions to the platform's right-wing extremists, inviting far-right conspiracy theorist Andy Ngo to report anti-fascist accounts directly to him. Among those suspended were a group that provides armed security to LGBT events, accounts parodying Elon Musk, and a Palestinian news outlet known for criticizing the Israeli military.

Incidents

Rose McGowan
In October 2017, actress Rose McGowan said that Twitter had suspended her account for 12 hours after she repeatedly tweeted about former film studio executive Harvey Weinstein's alleged sexual misconduct toward her and others. Twitter explained that McGowan's account had violated its privacy policy because one of her tweets included a private phone number. According to The New York Times, "Many Twitter users expressed outrage over Ms. McGowan's account being locked". After the tweet was removed, her account was unlocked several hours before the 12-hour ban was set to expire. A Twitter representative stated, "We will be clearer about these policies and decisions in the future". Later that day, software engineer Kelly Ellis, using the hashtag #WomenBoycottTwitter, urged women to shun Twitter for 24 hours, beginning at midnight, in solidarity with McGowan and with "all the victims of hate and harassment Twitter fails to support". Several activists, celebrities, and journalists joined the boycott. Others criticized the level of organization and the fact that it was only 24 hours.

2018 fake followers purge
On 11 July 2018, The New York Times reported that Twitter would begin to delete fake follower accounts to increase the authenticity of the platform.

The issue of fake follower accounts was highlighted in 2016 when Russian trolls, using both human-operated and bot accounts to appear legitimate, leveraged Twitter's reach among American voters in an interference campaign in that year's US elections.

Several celebrities and public figures lost substantial numbers of followers from their Twitter accounts before and after the closure of these accounts. These included Justin Bieber, Ellen DeGeneres, Jack Dorsey, Recep Tayyip Erdoğan, Ari Fleischer, Pope Francis, Lady Gaga, Ariana Grande, Kathy Ireland, Paul Kagame, Ashton Kutcher, The New York Times, Shaquille O'Neal, Barack Obama, Katy Perry, Queen Rania of Jordan, Rihanna, Cristiano Ronaldo, Taylor Swift, Donald Trump, Twitter themselves, Variety magazine, Kim Kardashian, Oprah Winfrey, and YouTube.

U.S. President Donald Trump said that social networks such as Twitter were "totally discriminating" against Republican Party and conservative users. Twitter and its CEO Jack Dorsey clarified that the reduction in the followers count was part of the platform's efforts to cut down on spamming and bot accounts. Dorsey's own account lost about 230,000 followers in the purge.

On 27 July 2018, Twitter's stock went down by 20.5% (equivalent to $6 billion). The user base declined to 325 million, down from 326 million.

Donald Trump

On 7 January 2021, Twitter temporarily locked the account of U.S. President Donald Trump after multiple controversies, including his use of the platform to undermine the results of the 2020 presidential election and to incite the 2021 United States Capitol attack. On 8 January, Twitter permanently suspended Trump's account, citing his violation of Twitter's Glorification of Violence guidelines. Twitter also suspended or heavily moderated accounts that enabled Trump to circumvent his ban, including the official @POTUS handle. Trump congratulated Nigeria for blocking Twitter, and wrote that he had hosted Zuckerberg for dinner in White House. Twitter was criticized for banning Trump but deleting Ali Khamenei tweets. Twitter also suspended the "From the Desk of Donald J. Trump" (@DJTDesk) account, citing ban evasion as the reason.

On 13 January 2021, Twitter founder Jack Dorsey tweeted about Trump's Twitter ban, fearing that although the ban was the correct decision for Twitter as a company, Twitter's actions "set a precedent I feel is dangerous: the power an individual or corporation has over a part of the global public conversation". In 2022, Dorsey has continued voicing concern over Twitter's role in internet centralization with his tweet on 2 March, stating "centralizing discovery and identity into corporations really damaged the internet. I realize I'm partially to blame, and regret it". Internet centralization continues to be a riveting conversation surrounding Twitter and its banning policies.

On 19 November 2022, Trump's account was reinstated by Elon Musk. Trump has yet to use his Twitter account since its reinstatement, instead focusing on making posts to his Truth Social social media platform.

2022 suspensions of journalists 

On 15 December 2022, a number of journalists, including journalists from The New York Times, CNN, Washington Post, and Voice of America had their accounts suspended. Musk claimed that the accounts had received a seven day suspension for violating the platforms "doxxing" policy by sharing his “exact real-time location”, with him comparing it to “assassination coordinates”. However, it was reported that none of the suspended journalists had actually shared Musk's precise real-time location on their accounts.

The suspensions were condemned by the United Nations, while the European Union threatened sanctions against Twitter under the EU's Digital Services Act that is scheduled to take effect in 2023 and requires social media companies to "respect media freedom and fundamental rights". A number of American Democratic Party lawmakers also criticized the bans.

Reporters Without Borders warned that if the suspensions were in retaliation for the journalists' work on Musk, they would be a "serious violation of the journalists' right to report the news without fear of reprisal". 

Most of the suspensions were lifted the next day, on 16 December 2022, after Musk put the decision on whether to reinstate the suspended accounts through an informal poll where 58.7% of voters chose lifting the suspensions immediately over 41.3% who voted to have the suspensions be lifted after 7 more days. The unbanned accounts remained restricted from posting until they removed the tweets that were claimed to be in violation of Twitter rules. Some of the journalists later appealed the decision, arguing their tweets weren't in violation.

List of notable suspensions

2010–2015

2016

2017

2018

2019

2020

2021

2022

2023

See also
Censorship of Twitter
December 15, 2022 Twitter suspensions
Deplatforming
Internet censorship
Shadow banning
Twitter Files
YouTube suspensions

References

Lists of Internet suspensions

Suspensions
Suspensions
Internet censorship by organization